I Owe You is the debut studio album by American gospel singer Kierra "Kiki" Sheard. It was released by EMI Gospel on September 7, 2004 in the United States. Sheard worked with a variety of producers on the album, including Warryn Campbell, Rodney Jerkins, PAJAM, and Tonéx. I Owe You debuted atop the US Billboard Top Gospel Albums and the Heatseekers Albums. It also reached number four on the Top Christian Albums and number 29 on the Top R&B/Hip-Hop Albums.

Critical reception

Allmusic editor Andree Farias found that I Owe You "can be so easily compartmentalized is not necessarily a sign of versatility, but an indicator that KiKi is merely following the lead of others. This is not a big deal in the case of debut albums, but the see-if-it-sticks mentality is ultimately too jarring to take in all at once. It's nice of Sheard to let herself be all things to all people, but here's hoping the follow-up to I Owe You is truly more her, not who her handlers want her to be."

Accolades
I Owe You was nominated for three Stellar Awards, including Contemporary Female Vocalist of the Year, Urban Song of the Year, and Contemporary CD of the Year. Sheard was also nominated for multiple Soul Train Music Awards, an NAACP Image Award, and multiple Dove Awards.

Track listing

Charts

Weekly charts

Year-end charts

References

2004 albums
Kierra Sheard albums